Style Savvy: Fashion Forward, known as  in Japan and as Nintendo Presents: New Style Boutique 2 − Fashion Forward in the PAL region, is a fashion-themed simulation video game developed by Syn Sophia and published by Nintendo in Japan, Europe and Australia in 2015, and in North America in 2016. It is the third installment in the Style Savvy series, following Style Savvy (2008) and Style Savvy: Trendsetters (2012), and it is followed by Style Savvy: Styling Star (2017). It was well received by critics."Show off your sense of style and dominate the fashion world across 5 exciting careers! Manage your own boutique, design clothes fit for a fashionista, style some wicked hair, master the art of make-up, and even become the next top model. The world is your runway in this fun fully outfitted fashion game." - Nintendo

Release 
The game was released for the Nintendo 3DS in Japan on April 16, 2015, in Europe on November 20, 2015, in Australia on November 21, 2015, and in North America on August 19, 2016.

Plot 
You awaken to receive a letter from your Grandmother, containing a key for a small dollhouse. Upon opening the door you are met with a doll-sized girl by the name of Sophie; who explains that your Grandmothers were best friends. Sophie is thrilled by your sense of fashion and invites you to help her struggling boutique in 'Beaumonde city'. Using your fashion skills and her social skills the two of you now work together to make the city a more fashionable place to be.

Unlike the previous games, Fashion Forward allows the player to work and be paid as a hair stylist and a make-up artist alongside managing the fashion boutique.

Images 
Each customer will have either a brand or image in mind and it's your job to choose items that will match their style or create a whole new image by combining different types.

Reception 

Fashion Forward was well received by critics, holding a score of 78/100 on the review aggregator Metacritic. The game went on to sell 1 million copies

Notes

References

External links
 

2015 video games
Nintendo 3DS eShop games
Nintendo 3DS games
Nintendo 3DS-only games
Nintendo games
Nintendo Network games
Simulation video games
Syn Sophia games
Video games developed in Japan
Video games that use Amiibo figurines
Video games set in amusement parks
Video games about toys
Multiplayer and single-player video games